= Fritz Hauß =

German judge

Fritz Hauß (27 October 1908 – 30 April 2003) was a German jurist and later 1972-1976 Vice President of the Federal Court.

In 1953 he was appointed district court Münster. In 1968 he was appointed Senate President (Chairman Judge). In 1976 Hauß retired. In 1977 he was appointed Chairman of the Appeals Committee of the German Press Council.

Hauß was a member of the Catholic student associations KStV Ravensberg Münster and Semnonia Berlin.
